Alendan lake is a lake with 17 hectare span located in Sari County. This lake belongs to Quaternary era and has recorded in The national index of Iran in 2015.

This lake is also called Pelle Azni because of the nearby village, Azni. The best way for going the lake is through Azni village, which has a flat way to the lake. The lake has a 70 km distance from Sari and located in Sari-Semnan road. (About two hour way from Semnan) The lake is 1200 m higher than sea level.

This lake is the main source of water for paddy fields of near villages like Azni, Mazarostaq, Konta, Didu and Zalam. However no river water comes to the lake, rain full fills the lake.

In recent years, fish farming has developed in the lake.

Plenty of various trees, including Carpinus betulus, oak, Ulmus glabra and Tilia, surrounded the lake.

Gallery

See also
Lake Urmia
Dokhaharan lake

References

Geography of Mazandaran Province
Sari County
Lakes of Iran
Tourist attractions in Mazandaran Province
Tourist attractions in Sari